Khalid bin Bandar Al Saud (born 1977) is the Saudi ambassador to the United Kingdom and a member of the House of Saud.

Early life and education
Born in 1977 in Paris, Khalid bin Bandar is the son of Bandar bin Sultan and Haifa bint Faisal Al Saud. His paternal grandfather is Sultan bin Abdulaziz Al Saud. The parents of his mother are King Faisal bin Abdulaziz and Iffat bint Mohammad Al Thunayan.

Khalid bin Bandar attended Eton College before going up to Pembroke College, Oxford, where he graduated in Oriental studies. He also attended Sandhurst Military Academy, graduating as a commissioned officer, before becoming a post-graduate at Fletcher School of Law and Diplomacy.

Career
Khalid bin Bandar started his career working at the United Nations' department of political affairs in New York. He worked for three years as an advisor to the Saudi Ambassador in Washington DC. He is the executive chairman of Dayim Holdings founded in 2006. He is also an acting general manager of Al Hama Company, a Saudi-based retail company, and the chairman of Byblos Real Estate Development Company based in the United Arab Emirates.

In June 2017, he became the Saudi ambassador to Germany. In 2019, he was made the Saudi ambassador to the United Kingdom.

Personal life
Khalid dated and lived with Vanessa Hayden, the future Vanessa Trump, from 1998 to 2001. They intended to marry, but broke up after September 11 attacks when he left the U.S. after his father was suspected of having indirect ties to the hijackers.

In Oxford in March 2011, Khalid married Lucy Caroline Cuthbert (born 1982), daughter of John Aidan Cuthbert, of Beaufront Castle, Hexham, Northumberland, and Lady Victoria Lucy Diana (daughter of Hugh Percy, 10th Duke of Northumberland), and thus, niece of Ralph Percy, 12th Duke of Northumberland, at a ceremony attended by a handful of guests.

References

Khalid
21st-century diplomats
1977 births
Khalid
Khalid
Khalid
Khalid
Khalid
Living people
Khalid
Khalid